Taekwondo at the 2020 Summer Paralympics was held at the Makuhari Messe; the same location where goalball, volleyball and wheelchair fencing took place. This was the first time that taekwondo was included in the Summer Paralympic Games.

The 2020 Summer Olympic and Paralympic Games were postponed to 2021 due to the COVID-19 pandemic. They kept the 2020 name and were held from 24 August to 5 September 2021.

Only Kyorugi was practiced at the Tokyo 2020 Games. There are two classes at Para Taekwondo, K43 for athletes with restrictions on both sides of their arms below the elbow joint and K44 for athletes with restrictions on one side in ther arm or leg. Both classes competed in the K44 class at the Tokyo 2020 Games.

Qualification

Ranking lists began from 1 January 2018 to 31 January 2020. Continental qualification tournaments also determined what athletes would compete in the Summer Paralympics.

Schedule

Qualified nations

Medal table

Medalists

See also
Taekwondo at the 2020 Summer Olympics
Para Taekwondo
Parataekwondo at the Summer Paralympics

References

External links
Results book 

2020 Summer Paralympics events
2020
 
Taekwondo competitions in Japan
Paralympics